The World Series Cricket tour of the West Indies took place between February and April 1979. It was the second tour event of World Series Cricket after the World XI New Zealand tour earlier in the season. It was the first tour to feature the WSC West Indies and WSC Supertests. The five match Supertest series was drawn 1–1. It ran in parallel with the ODI series which the West Indies won easily, 8–2.

Squads

Note: Number of Supertests and One-Day matches in brackets

Itinerary

Compared to previous international tours to the West Indies the schedule of the WSC tour was rigorous. The previous year the official Australia side had conducted a tour of the West Indies that took in five Test matches, two ODIs and six tour matches from 17 February to 3 May. The WSC tour featured five Supertests and twelve ODIs from 20 February to 13 April. What made the tour so physically demanding were the back to back ODIs and constant travelling between Islands with only a day between fixtures. On top of the gruelling itinerary, the cricket was intense and of the highest standard, unlike traditional tours that feature matches against weak opposition.

Supertests

1st Supertest

The Australian newspaper reported that never before had an Australian XI led by Ian Chappell been so humiliated in defeat. Australia had started well reducing the West Indies to 119–7. But Clive Lloyd as he had done so often before, resisted scoring a vital 56, aputting on 40 runs for the last wicket with the capable Wayne Daniel (17*). Chappell was delighted with his bowlers performance on a first day that closed with Australia 33/2, Ian out along with Bruce Laird and brother Trevor retired hurt. Twelve wickets would fall on the second day, Australia were bowled out for just 106, the four pronged West Indian attack making mince-meat of the Aussie batting card. With a lead of 76 the West Indies batted positively, compiling a total of 481 at a remarkable run rate of 4.39 runs per over. Clive Lloyd was again the star scoring a brilliant 197 before being the eighth batsman dismissed. Requiring an unlikely 558 runs to win in their second innings, the aggressive Ian Chappell chose to open the batting, protecting Trevor from the new ball. Ian made 41 but his side were only 83–4 at his dismissal and on the verge of a crushing defeat. Ray Bright made a good 47 not out, but the Australian tail were blown away by the four quicks, complemented by the medium pace of Richard Austin. The West Indies completed a 369 run win on the fourth day.

2nd Supertest

Play was suspended midway through Day 5 after the crowd threw bottles onto the ground. This was to protest against the umpire's decision to dismiss Roy Fredericks by leg before wicket. The match was abandoned at 2:30 pm and ended in a draw.

3rd Supertest

4th Supertest

A result was never likely in the 4th Supertest at Bourda. When the Australians landed at Guyana they discovered it had been raining for days. On the scheduled first day play was abandoned before the players had even left for the ground. That evening the pitch was still underwater. On the second day the rain had stopped and it was hot and sunny. Yet the two captains, Chappell and Lloyd, decided the condition of the outfield was unfit for play, Greg Chappell describing it as a "quagmire". Unfortunately for the cricketers and officials at Bourda, thousands of spectators had been allowed into the ground that morning. Ian Chappell recalls how he was visited in the dressing rooms by the local chief of police and told, "If there is no play today, I am afraid to tell you that I can no longer guarantee your safety at the ground." The consensus was that there must, therefore, be some sort of play. The captains and umpires agreed to start play at 4 pm and play for roughly an hour until the light faded. However a misinformed PA announced to the crowd that play would begin at 3 pm. This enraged the volatile Chappell, who then reneged on the deal and refused to play. The crowd, many of whom had been drinking rum and partying all day, sensed no play and began a riot. Both teams and the officials were locked in their dressing rooms. The Australians donned their new batting helmets and took guard with their bats, behind the bolted door. The rioters attacked the pavilion causing major damage and a couple of unnamed West Indian cricketers suffered minor injuries from broken glass. Chappell recalls a conversation after the event with West Indian wicketkeeper Deryck Murray. Murray insisted that the riot was a result of growing unhappiness at the Guyanese president Arthur Chung and that they used the abandoned cricket as an excuse. He believed that the rioters would never have intentionally harmed any of the cricketers. The words reassured some of the Australians, but many wanted to leave Guyana immediately and head to the next island, while some (about eight, which is half the squad) were considering returning to Australia. Chappell demanded his players stay and play, making a statement to the West Indian fans that they are not intimidated and will play to win. Play proceeded on the third morning as if nothing had happened. The ground was cleared of broken glass and the game played out to a draw with a century from Greg Chappell confirming his status as the outstanding batsman of the series.

5th Supertest

One Day Internationals

1st ODI

2nd ODI

3rd ODI

4th ODI

5th ODI

6th ODI

7th ODI

8th ODI

9th ODI

10th ODI

11th ODI

12th ODI

References 

1979 in West Indian cricket
International cricket competitions from 1975–76 to 1980
1979
West Indian cricket seasons from 1970–71 to 1999–2000
World Series Cricket